Seo Kwan-Soo  (25 February 1980) is a South Korean football forward and midfielder.

He has formerly played for FC Gifu in the J2 League.

Club career 

Seo made his professional debut with Seongnam Ilwha, having joined the club in 2002 from Dankook University.  Although he stayed with Seongnam for three seasons, he never featured as a regular at senior level, making only three K-League appearances in this period.  He transferred to Daegu FC in 2006, but played only one competitive match for the club, in the League Cup.  For 2007, he moved to Suwon City FC, who play in the second tier, semi-professional Korea National League.  Following two seasons at Suwon, Seo moved to Japanese J2 League club FC Gifu.

External links 

1980 births
Living people
Association football forwards
Association football midfielders
South Korean footballers
South Korean expatriate footballers
Seongnam FC players
Daegu FC players
Suwon FC players
FC Gifu players
K League 1 players
J2 League players
Korea National League players
Expatriate footballers in Japan
South Korean expatriate sportspeople in Japan
Dankook University alumni